Zonitoides is a genus of air-breathing land snails, terrestrial gastropod mollusks in the family Gastrodontidae.

Distribution 
The distribution of Zonitoides includes North America, eastern and northern Asia, and Europe.

Species
Species within the genus Zonitoides include:
 Zonitoides arboreus (Say, 1817)
 Zonitoides excavatus (Alder, 1830)
Zonitoides hoffmanni (Martens, 1892)
 Zonitoides jaccetanicus (Bourguignat, 1870)
Zonitoides multivolvis (Pilsbry, 1926)
 Zonitoides nitidus  (Müller, 1774) - type species
 Zonitoides sepultus Ložek, 1964

Anatomy 
Species in this genus of snails make and use love darts.

References

External links 
 

Gastrodontidae
Taxonomy articles created by Polbot